Sarah Curtis may refer to:

 Sarah Curtis (Dynasty character)
 Sarah Curtis (geographer), British geographer of health and wellbeing
 Sarah Hoadly (née Curtis; 1676–1743)